"Musik sein" is a song by German recording artist Wincent Weiss. It was written by Weiss, Sascha Wernicke, Oliver Avalon, Fabian Strangl, David Müller, and Kevin Zaremba and produced by the latter for his debut studio album Irgendwas gegen die Stille (2017). The dance pop song was released as the album's lead single on 11 April 2016 and became a top ten hit in Austria and Switzerland, while reaching the top thirty of the German Singles Chart.

Formats and track listings

Credits and personnel

 Peter "Jem" Seifert – mixing
 Fabian Strangl – backing vocals

 Wincent Weiss – vocals
 Kevin Zaremba – production

Charts

Certifications

References

2016 songs